Pseudacanthicus fordii is a species of armored catfish endemic to Suriname where it occurs in the coastal river drainages.  This species grows to a length of  TL.

References
 

Ancistrini
Fish described in 1868
Taxa named by Albert Günther
Fish of Suriname
Endemic fauna of Suriname